Evelyn Silvestro (born 1 March 1999) is an Argentine rower. She competed in the women's lightweight double sculls event at the 2020 Summer Olympics.

References

External links
 

1999 births
Living people
Argentine female rowers
Olympic rowers of Argentina
Rowers at the 2020 Summer Olympics
People from Zárate, Buenos Aires
Sportspeople from Buenos Aires Province
21st-century Argentine women